Tribonanthes violacea belongs to the genus Tribonanthes in the bloodwort family, Haemodoraceae. It was first described by Stephan Endlicher in 1846. It is a perennial herb growing from 0.05 to 0.2 m high, in peat, white, grey or yellow sands, clay loams and granite in areas which are seasonally wet and on granite outcrops. Its white to purple flowers are seen from July to October.

It is found in the IBRA regions: Avon Wheatbelt, Esperance Plains, Geraldton Sandplains, Jarrah Forest, Swan Coastal Plain and Warren.

References

External links

Haemodoraceae
Commelinales of Australia
Angiosperms of Western Australia
Endemic flora of Western Australia
Taxa named by Stephan Endlicher